Mikaniopsis vitalba is a species of flowering plant in the family Asteraceae. It is found in Angola, Cameroon, Democratic Republic of the Congo, Gabon, and Uganda. Its natural habitats are subtropical or tropical moist lowland forests, subtropical or tropical swamps, subtropical or tropical moist montane forests, and moist savanna. It is threatened by habitat loss.

References

vitalba
Flora of West Tropical Africa
Flora of Angola
Flora of Uganda
Vulnerable plants
Taxonomy articles created by Polbot